Hermann, Freiherr Dahlen-Orlaburg (10 January 1828, in Kaschau – 15 November 1887, in Vienna) was an Austrian administrator. He was the Austrian governor of Bosnia and Herzegovina from 1881 to 1882.

1828 births
1887 deaths
Barons of Austria
Governors of Bosnia and Herzegovina
Politicians from Košice